Andrew Jackson Kirk (March 19, 1866 – May 25, 1933) was an American lawyer and politician who served part of one term as a U.S. Representative from Kentucky in 1926 and 1927.

Early life and career 
Born near Warfield, Kentucky, Kirk attended the common schools.  He graduated from the law department of Valparaiso University (Indiana) in 1890.  He was admitted to the bar the same year and commenced practice in Inez, Kentucky.  He served as county attorney of Martin County 1894-1898, and as commonwealth attorney for the twenty-fourth judicial district of Kentucky 1898-1904.  He was circuit judge of the same district 1904-1916.  He resumed the practice of law in Jenkins, Letcher County, and in Paintsville, Kentucky, in 1918.

Congress 
Kirk was elected as a Republican to the Sixty-ninth Congress to fill the vacancy caused by the resignation of John W. Langley and served from February 13, 1926, to March 3, 1927.  He was an unsuccessful candidate for renomination in 1926 when he was defeated by Langley's wife.

Later career and death 
He resumed the practice of law in Paintsville, Kentucky.  He served as Republican candidate for nomination as circuit judge at the time of his death in Paintsville, Kentucky, May 25, 1933.  

He was interred in Kirk Cemetery near Inez, Kentucky.

References 

Andrew Jackson Kirk at The Political Graveyard

1866 births
1933 deaths
American prosecutors
Kentucky Commonwealth's Attorneys
Kentucky lawyers
People from Martin County, Kentucky
Republican Party members of the United States House of Representatives from Kentucky
People from Paintsville, Kentucky